The surname Hempenstall is a toponym, originating from the village of Heptonstall in Yorkshire, England.  The first recorded instance of the name is in the Court Rolls of the Manor of Wakefield, Yorkshire, which lists a John de Heptonstall as a minor knight in 1297.

Origins and Alternative Spellings 

The name has evolved considerably over the centuries from the original Anglo-Saxon, derived from heope, denu, and stall – meaning "Rose-hip", "valley" and "cattle-station", respectively.  

Alternative spellings of the modern surname include:

Heptonstall
Heptinstall
Heppenstall
Hepplestall
Heppenspall
Hempenstall

Irish Hempenstalls 

As a surname in Ireland, it is mostly encountered in the province of Leinster, though, in recent years, at least one branch of the family has been established in the Limerick area of Munster.

References

Surnames
English toponymic surnames